Thomas Henry Morris (14 September 1884 – 24 March 1918) was an English professional footballer who played in the Football League for Leeds City and Grimsby Town, as well as in the Southern League for Brighton & Hove Albion. A centre half as a player, he later coached at Scunthorpe & Lindsey United.

Personal life 
In March 1915, during the second year of the First World War, Morris enlisted in the Lincolnshire Regiment. He was serving as a sergeant when he was killed in the Somme sector on 24 March 1918. Morris is commemorated on the Pozières Memorial.

Career statistics

References 

1884 births
Military personnel from Lincolnshire
People from Caistor
English footballers
Grimsby Town F.C. players
Association football wing halves
English Football League players
British Army personnel of World War I
Brighton & Hove Albion F.C. players
Royal Lincolnshire Regiment soldiers
British military personnel killed in World War I
1918 deaths
Leeds City F.C. players
Scunthorpe United F.C. players
Coventry City F.C. players
Scunthorpe United F.C. non-playing staff
Southern Football League players
Midland Football League players